VIA Vancouver Institute for the Americas (1998–2007) was a Canadian organization of higher education dedicated to the research and projects implementation of Education for sustainable development centered in the academic integration of the Americas, under the guidance of the International Bureau of Education.VIA operated from their main training center located at 470 Granville Street, Vancouver, in the province of British Columbia, and from their southern regional training center located at Las Condes, in Santiago, Chile. VIA was an organization incorporated in British Columbia, with a subsidiary registered in Santiago. VIA was an institute registered at the Ministry of Advanced Education of British Columbia as a provider of higher private education, allowing to provide accredited certifications and its programs qualified for provincial financial assistance and Canadian government scholarship programs.

Creation

In 1998, "la profesora universitaria Dra. Paz" the university professor Dr. Paz Buttedahl, at the University of British Columbia (UBC), launched an academic organization dedicated to the vocational and professional development of educators across the Americas. Dra. Paz aim was centered in Education for Sustainable Development, giving the vision for the creation of VIA Vancouver Institute for the Americas, the main office was initially located at UBC Faculty of Education, University of British Columbia main campus, in Point Grey, Vancouver; while collaborating with the Vancouver Institute, Global Reporting Centre, that has brought the University of British Columbia and Vancouver community together through free public lectures since 1916. 

The founding team was composed of faculty members and research students, until VIA's provincial incorporation and business licensing, then Paz Buttedahl selected a corporate team of field experts led by: 
 Dra. Paz Buttedahl, President; Prof. Dr. Knute Buttedahl VP and Chief Financial Officer (CFO); Prof. Vito de Candia-Levieux, Director of Learning Systems; Prof. Lucía Carvajal, Director for VIA Regional Center in Santiago, Chile;This team operated jointly with a multidisciplinary team of researchers, writers, faculty and university interns implementing multi-location projects across the Americas and extended to the Asia Pacific region.

Projects

VIA main participation was the introduction of the Digital Process of academic programs. VIA's implementations of sustainable education projects were mainly funded by the Canadian International Development Agency (CIDA), impacting the fields of research and professional development for e-learning and the Global Education industry working with UNESCO ASPNet initiatives. VIA's main research program was centered in human resources, with a focus on inclusion of multi-generational and gender equity in the workplace; these projects were affiliated and funded by University of British Columbia, UNESCO and the International Development Research Centre (IDRC). 
Along VIA's philanthropic contributions, the institute participated in Peace Building initiatives and organized events for the World Academy of Art and Science, the Peacebuilding Commission, and the Vancouver Institute Lectures.

Legacy

Among VIA's main initiatives, it is well recorded at UBC its pioneering program of academic mobility across the Americas, and its active participation in the transformation process of digital academic curriculum working with the Global e-learning project ENLACES-Mineduc, based in Chile; also its affiliation to FLACSO University research projects.
VIA stopped operating at the death of its founder Paz Buttedahl in 2007.

See also 
 VIA University College, since 2008 in Denmark

References

 Association of Universities and Colleges of Canada Profile Association of Universities and Colleges of Canada Profile.

Educational organizations based in British Columbia